Radosław Sobolewski (born 13 December 1976) is a retired Polish footballer who played as a defensive midfielder and a football manager. He represented the Poland national team. He is currently the head coach of I liga club Wisła Kraków.

Club career

Born in Białystok, Sobolewski started his career playing for Jagiellonia Białystok. In 1998, he was transferred to Wisła Płock, where he played for the next four years. He debuted in the top division on 7 March 1998 playing for Wisła Płock against Raków Częstochowa. In January 2003 he joined Dyskobolia Grodzisk Wielkopolski, where he stayed until December 2004. Since then he has played for Wisła Kraków, helping the team to achieve the Ekstraklasa titles in 2004–05, 2007–08, 2008–09 and 2010–11 seasons.

During the 2005–06 winter transfer period, he was approached by Southampton FC. However, the offer made by the English club was turned down by Wisła Kraków's board.

International career
Sobolewski was selected to the 23-men national squad for the 2006 FIFA World Cup finals in Germany. At this tournament, he received a red card for two bookable offences in his team's second group-stage match against Germany. He was the fourth player to see red in the tournament and the first Polish player to be sent off in the World Cup.

Radosław Sobolewski retired from international football on Tuesday 20 November 2007, shocking Polish football fans by doing so as it was just three days after Poland's 2–0 win over Belgium which ensured their passage to Euro 2008.

International goals

Coaching career
After retiring in the summer 2016, Sobolewski became assistant manager of his former club Wisła Kraków. During his period at the club, which lasted until August 2019, Sobolewski was appointed joint-caretaker manager alongside the club's second assistant manager, Kazimierz Kmiecik, three times: The first time on 10 November 2016, when Dariusz Wdowczyk was fired until Kiko Ramírez was appointed on 5 January 2017. The second time on 10 December 2017, where Kiko Ramírez was fired again, for the rest of 2017 before Joan Carrillo was appointed manager. And the last and third time on 12 June 2018, where Carrillo was fired again, this time it lasted for only one week before a new manager was appointed.

On 7 August 2019, he was appointed manager of Wisła Płock.

On 12 April 2021, he was fired from Wisła Płock.

On 14 February 2022, Sobolewski was appointed assistant manager at Wisła Kraków after Jerzy Brzęczek became their head coach. 

On 3 October 2022, following Brzęczek's dismissal, he became Wisła's new head coach.

Statistics

Managerial statistics

Record

Honours

Wisła Płock
 I Liga: 1998–99

Dyskobolia
Polish Cup: 2004–05

Wisła Kraków
Ekstraklasa: 2004–05, 2007–08, 2008–09, 2010–11

Individual
Ekstraklasa Midfielder of the Year: 2005
Ekstraklasa Player of the Month: March 2009

References

External links

 
 National team stats on pzpn.pl 
 Player profile on FIFA.com

1976 births
Living people
Polish footballers
Polish football managers
Poland international footballers
Jagiellonia Białystok players
Wisła Płock players
Dyskobolia Grodzisk Wielkopolski players
Wisła Kraków players
2006 FIFA World Cup players
Sportspeople from Białystok
Ekstraklasa players
Górnik Zabrze players
Wisła Kraków managers
Wisła Płock managers
Association football midfielders